Karen Tucker Baseball Stadium (Spanish Estadio de Beisbol Karen Tucker) is a ballpark located in the Corn Islands of the South Caribbean Coast Autonomous Region of Nicaragua. The stadium is specifically located near Quinn Hill neighborhood of Brig Bay adjacent to Corn Island Airport.

External links 
 Photos of the stadium

Baseball venues in Nicaragua
South Caribbean Coast Autonomous Region